Ramu Cantonment is a cantonment located in Ramu of Cox's Bazar, Bangladesh. It is the headquarter of 10th Infantry Division of Bangladesh Army. The area of the cantonment is 3000 acres.

History and Layout 

24th Infantry Battalion was stationed at Ramu but it lacked infrastructure. So, the government decided to upgrade it to a full-fledged cantonment.

Establishment of cantonment 
Prime Minister Sheikh Hasina confirmed the approval for a new cantonment in Ramu on 19 April 2014. Army was allocated 1,800 acres of forest land in Ramu. Of those 1,180 acres in Rajarkul, 264.55 acres in Khuniyapalang, and 344.43 acres in Umakhali Mouza.

On 10 March 2016, she inaugurated construction of a road titled "Bir Sarani", memorial "Ajeyo" commemorating the division, a multipurpose shade "Birangan" and a composite barrack named "Matamuhuri" built at Alikadom Cantonment.

Key installations 
Under the division there are two infantry brigade, one artillery brigade, five infantry regiments, three artillery regiment, one engineering battalion and other various units including SSD Ramu and two field workshop units. Major General Fakhrul Ahsan, BSP, ndu, psc is the current General Officer Commanding of the division.

Combat Arms

 Armoured
 16 Cavalry Regiment
 Regiment of Artillery
 10 Artillery Brigade
 23 Field Regiment Artillery
 40 Field Regiment Artillery
 28 Medium Regiment Artillery
 Infantry:
 2 Infantry Brigade
 97 Infantry Brigade
 8 East Bengal Regiment
 60 East Bengal Regiment
 63 East Bengal Regiment
 36 Bangladesh Infantry Regiment
 37 Bangladesh Infantry Regiment
 38 Bangladesh Infantry Regiment
 39 Bangladesh Infantry Regiment
 79 East Bengal Regiment

 Ordnance Corps
 509 Division Ordnance Company
 10 Independent Ammunition Platoon
 Corps of Signals (Sig)
 9 Signal Battalion
 39 Signal Battalion
 Corps of Engineers
 4 Engineer Battalion

Combat Service support

 Army Medical Corps
 CMH Ramu
 55 Field Ambulance
 95 Field Ambulance

Education institutions
Ramu Cantonment English School and College
Ramu Cantonment Public School and College

.

r.

See also 
 Alikadam Cantonment
 Bandarban Cantonment
 Dhaka Cantonment
 Rangamati Cantonment

References

Cantonments of Bangladesh
2015 establishments in Bangladesh
Military installations established in 2015